March Kong Fong Eu ( Kong; March 29, 1922 – December 21, 2017) was an American politician. She was a member of the California State Assembly and went on to serve as Secretary of State of California.

Early life and education
Eu was born March Kong on March 29, 1922 in Oakdale, California in the San Joaquin Valley, where her Chinese immigrant parents Yuen Kong and Shiu Shee ran a hand-wash laundry. Her grandparents immigrated to the U.S. from Huaxian County (now Huadu District) in the South China province of Guangdong. The family later moved to Richmond, California.

Eu earned a Bachelor of Science in dentistry from the University of California, Berkeley in 1943 and a Master of Arts from Mills College. She earned an Ed.D. from the Stanford Graduate School of Education in 1954.

Career
She became a dental hygienist and served a term as president of the American Dental Hygienist Association. In the 1950s she served on the Alameda County School Board.

California Assembly
In 1966 Eu was elected as a Democrat to the California State Assembly from the 15th District, representing Oakland and Castro Valley. She served four terms. She is perhaps best known for her successful campaign to ban pay toilets, arguing that they discriminated against women since urinals were free.

California Secretary of State
Eu was elected Secretary of State of California in 1974, becoming the first Asian American woman ever elected to a state constitutional office in the United States. She remained the only woman to serve as California Secretary of State until 2006, when voters elected Debra Bowen. Eu was elected Secretary of State five times.  In 1978 she won every county in the state, even heavily Republican Orange County, making her one of only five  Democrats to win the county in a statewide race in the last half century. She resigned in 1994 when President Bill Clinton nominated her for an ambassadorship.

Innovations she introduced during her 20 years as Secretary of State included voter registration by mail; providing absentee ballots to anyone who requested them; posting results on the Internet; and including candidate statements in ballot pamphlets. In 1976, she became the first woman to serve as Governor of California, serving as acting governor while Governor Jerry Brown was out of the state.

Other political activities
In 1987 Eu was a candidate for the Democratic nomination for the U.S. Senate, running against Leo McCarthy for the right to challenge the Republican incumbent, Pete Wilson. Amid poor fund-raising totals and her husband's unwillingness to release details of his business interests, Eu dropped out later that year.

President Bill Clinton appointed Eu as United States Ambassador to the Federated States of Micronesia in 1994. She served in that post until 1996.

In 2002 Eu, then age 79, ran again for Secretary of State, saying she was doing so because "Florida made me mad", referring to the voting problems in Florida during the 2000 United States presidential election. She lost in the Democratic primary to Kevin Shelley, who went on to win the election.

Later life and family
Eu resided both in California and Singapore with her second husband Henry Eu, a multimillionaire industrialist. Her adopted son, Matt Fong, was a Republican activist who served as California State Treasurer for a four-year term that began January 1995. She also had a daughter, Suyin. Her hobbies in retirement included Chinese brush painting and calligraphy. Eu died on December 21, 2017, at age 95, following a fall.

Recognition
In 2019 California's Secretary of State building in Sacramento was named after Eu (as the March Fong Eu Secretary of State Building); this made it the first state-owned building to be named for an Asian-American woman.

The National Notary Association gives an annual March Fong Eu Award to "the individual who or organization that, in the judgment of the Association's Executive Committee, has done the most to improve the standards, image and quality of the office of Notary Public." Eu was the first recipient of the award in 1979, named after her "for her extraordinary leadership in spearheading enactment of progressive Notary reform legislation, despite opposition from powerful lobbies who preferred lower notarial standards."

References

External links
 March K. Fong Eu political history
 

1922 births
2017 deaths
20th-century American politicians
20th-century American women politicians
Accidental deaths from falls
Accidental deaths in California
Ambassadors of the United States to the Federated States of Micronesia
California politicians of Chinese descent
American women ambassadors
American women of Chinese descent in politics
Democratic Party members of the California State Assembly
Mills College alumni
People from Oakdale, California
Politicians from Richmond, California
School board members in California
Secretaries of State of California
Stanford Graduate School of Education alumni
University of California, Berkeley alumni
Women state legislators in California
21st-century American diplomats
21st-century American women